Melissa Mary Militano (married name: Warkmeister; born April 26, 1955 in Rockville Centre, New York) is an American former competitive figure skater who competed as a single skater and pair skater.  As a pair skater, she won the U.S. Figure Skating Championships three times, in 1973 with her brother Mark Militano and in 1974 and 1975 with Johnny Johns.  Their coaches included Peter Dunfield and Ron Ludington.

Melissa and Mark Militano represented the United States at the 1972 Winter Olympics where they placed 7th. 

Militano was also a talented singles skater.  At the 1970 United States Figure Skating Championships, she became one of the first female skaters to successfully perform a triple toe loop jump in competition, in a performance that won her the bronze medal in the junior ladies division.  At the 1971 U.S. Figure Skating Championships, she won the junior ladies title, again landing a clean triple toe loop.  She later gave up competing in singles skating to focus on pairs.

Militano and Johns retired from competitive skating in 1975 and toured with Ice Capades.  After her marriage in 1979, she had little involvement with skating for many years, but currently works as a part-time coach in Las Vegas, Nevada.

Competitive highlights

Ladies' singles

Pairs with Johnny Johns

Pairs with Mark Militano

References

 "Militano Warkmeister finds bliss in desert", Skating, Aug/Sept 2008.

External links
 

American female pair skaters
American female single skaters
Figure skaters at the 1972 Winter Olympics
Olympic figure skaters of the United States
1955 births
Living people
People from Rockville Centre, New York